Durgi is a census village & Panchayat Headquarter of Bissam Cuttack Block in Rayagada district of Odisha, India. There are total 439 families residing in this village. The wards/ villages comes under Durgi Panchayat are:- Durgi, Bhaleri, Kundanpadar, Rengabai, Barangpadar, Thambalpadhu, Budhanagar, Kachapai, Kalipadar, Kurankul, Tentili Kalipadar, Mulipada, Dharamguda, Balipadar, Haduguda, Huruguda, Khariguda and IAY Colony.

Geography 
Durgi is located at .It has an average elevation of .The village is surrounded by forests with mostly Sal (Dalbergia Latifolia), Teak (Tectona Grandis) and Mango trees. Its outer region is completely covered by forests and hills.

Demographics 
 India census, the total population of the village is 1792 out of which male population is 858 and the female population is 934. Durgi village has higher literacy rate compared to Odisha literacy rate. In 2011, literacy rate of Durgi village was 75.51% compared to 72.87% of Odisha. In Durgi Male literacy stands at 81.50% while female literacy rate was 70.18%. . population of children with age 0-6 is 232 which makes up 12.95% of total population of village. Average Sex Ratio of Durgi village is 1089 which is higher than Odisha state average of 979. Child Sex Ratio for the Durgi as per census is 886, lower than Orissa average of 941. Durgi village has a substantial population of Schedule Caste (SC) constitutes 29.80% while Schedule Tribe (ST) were 15.79% of total population. The major language spoken in this region is Odia. Though Odia is predominantly spoken in Durgi, there is a diverse cultural mix with people speaking in Telugu and Hindi as well. The tribal populated villages around Durgi are using a tribal language called "Kandho".

Temples of divinity

A no. of temples enhance the cultural beauty of the village. They are:
 The temple of Lord Jagannath by the main road
 The temple of Goddess Bhairavi opposite of Sri Jagannath Temple
 The temple of Grama Devi (Thakurani Mandir)
 The temple of Lord Shiva which is more than 150 years old made by the than ruler of Durgi
 The temple of Radhakanta by the main road and another Radhakrishna Mandir in mid of the village.
 The temple of Sri Satya Sai Baba
 The Temple of Maa Manikeshwari

Visiting places 
The water of this reservoir irrigates many acres of land near by Durgi, Bhaleri, Kundanpadar, Balipadar and also supplies drinking water to Durgi village. Its construction was completed in the year 2000.The panoramic view of the reservoir is a popular tourist attraction as well as a popular picnic destination. There is also a spring and water fall named "Tumbalpadu", a scenic spot just 2 km away from Durgi.

Educational Institutes 
 U.P. School (provides 1st to 5th standard primary education; 100 years old)
 M.E. School (provides 6th and 7th standard middle education)
 P.S. High School (provides 8th to 10th standard higher secondary education; 50 years old)
 Saraswati Sisu Vidya Mandir
 Kasturaba Gandhi Balika Vidyalaya
 Central Modern School

Financial and other government institutions 
 Utkal Grameen Bank
 Panchayat Office
 Indian Post Office
 Primary Health Centre (Dispensary)
 Veterinary Hospital
 PWD Bungalow
 Revenue Bungalow
 Vijayanand Youth Club
 Forest Office

Festivities and culture 
Besides the annual Rath Yatra (Car Festival of Lord Jagannath), another popular festival celebrated in the village is the 'Ghanto Parbo' or 'Thakurani Yatra' (procession of the goddess) held usually during summer. During the festival, every community has the chance to take its goddesses out of the temples and visit all other localities. The processions last for days and weeks, with dramas and other entertainment held during the nights. Local musical instruments like 'Dombo Baido' and 'Ghumura' accompany such processions. Durgi is famous for its grand Dolo Purnima (Faguna Yatra) celebrations as well. People and the educational institutions of the village also do celebrate "Ganesh Puja," "Saraswati Puja" every year. Gram Devi is the prime Goddess of Durgi. The temple of Lord Jagannath was inaugurated by the King of Puri "Gajpati Sri Sri Dibya Narayan Singh Deo".

Transportation and communication

Road 
Durgi is connected to other parts of Odisha by state highway SH17 (Gunupur-Digapahandi-Berhampur) and SH04 (Paralakhemundi-Gunupur-Rayagada-Koraput). The nearest major town is Gunupur 40 km away and Rayagada which is 51 km away.
Odisha State Road Transport Corporation, and Private buses run daily between Durgi to other parts of Odisha and Andhra Pradesh. The place is well connected to Bhubaneswar, Cuttack, Berhampur, Rayagada, Koraput, Jeypore, Bhawanipatna, Paralakhemundi,    Palasa, Srikakulam, Vijayanagaram, Visakhapatnam.
Taxi services are also easily available in Durgi. One can arrange them from local tour operators.

Railway
Durgi is well connected with the nearby railway stations like Gunupur (40;km away), Muniguda (35;km away) and Rayagada (51; km away). Gunupur, which is connected by the 90 km long  broad gaugerailway line to Naupada railway junction on the Howrah-Chennai main line.

Rayagada railway station is an important station from where direct trains are available to Mumbai, Chennai, Kolkata, Hyderabad, Bhubaneswar, Raipur, New Delhi, Bangalore, Ahmedabad, Puri, Visakhapatnam, Vizianagaram and other cities. Rayagada Railway station comes in between Visakhapatnam-Raipur main line. Trains towards Raipur are passing through Muniguda railway station.

Air
The nearest airport is the Visakhapatnam Airport at a distance of 240 km towards the south. The other nearest airports are the Bhubaneswar Airport, which is about 370 km, and Raipur Airport, which is around 340 km.

Politics
As per constitution of India and Panchyati Raaj Act, Durgi village is administrated by Sarpanch (Head of Village) who is elected representative of village. Current MLA from Bissam Cuttack (ST) Assembly Constituency is Sri Jagannath Saraka of BJD, who won the seat in State elections of 2014 for the first time.
Durgi comes under the Koraput (Lok Sabha constituency). Sri Jhinna Hikakka of BJD is the present elected MP of the Koraput (ST) Lok Sabha constituency. After independence, Durgi has been playing a prominent role in politics in Rayagada District in general and Bissam Cuttack constituency in particular. Many leaders are emerged from the land of Durgi and contributed significantly in politics. The popular personalities like Sri Trinath Das (Block Chairman, Bissam Cuttack) and Sri Sudhir Das (President of BJD, Rayagada District) do belongs from this place. Chief Ministers like late Biju Patnaik, Navin Patnaik and Giridhar Gomango also visited to this place for their socio-political work.

Image Gallery

References

Cities and towns in Rayagada district